The British Nationality Act 1981 (c.61) is an Act of the Parliament of the United Kingdom concerning British nationality since 1 January 1983.

History

In the mid-1970s the British Government decided to update the nationality code, which had been significantly amended since the British Nationality Act 1948 came into force on 1 January 1949. In 1977, a Green Paper was produced by the Labour government outlining options for reform of the nationality code.  This was followed in 1980 by a White Paper by the Conservative government that closely followed the Labour proposals. William Whitelaw, the Home Secretary under Prime Minister Margaret Thatcher, was the chief author.  The British Nationality Act 1981 received Royal Assent on 30 October 1981 and came into force on 1 January 1983.  Both major parties were in agreement on the new law.

Subsequently, the British Nationality Act has been significantly amended, including:

 British Nationality (Falkland Islands) Act 1983
 Hong Kong Act 1985 and Hong Kong (British Nationality) Order 1986 
 British Nationality (Hong Kong) Act 1990, which introduced the British Nationality Selection Scheme
 Hong Kong (War Wives and Widows) Act 1996
 British Nationality (Hong Kong) Act 1997
 Adoption (Intercountry Aspects) Act 1999
 British Overseas Territories Act 2002
 Nationality, Immigration and Asylum Act 2002
 Immigration, Asylum and Nationality Act 2006
 Borders, Citizenship and Immigration Act 2009

Objectives of the Act

Reclassification of United Kingdom and Colonies citizenship
The Act reclassified Citizenship of the United Kingdom and Colonies (CUKC) into three categories:

 British citizenship 
 British Dependent Territories citizenship (BDTC); and 
 British Overseas citizenship.

In 1968, with the passage of the Commonwealth Immigrants Act 1968 to modify the wording of the Commonwealth Immigrants Act 1962, some CUKCs were stripped of the Right of Abode in the United Kingdom without their consents.  The Act sought to restore once again the link between citizenship and right of abode by providing that British citizenship—held by those with a close connection with either the United Kingdom or with the Crown Dependencies (that is to say, the Isle of Man and the Channel Islands), or both—would automatically carry a right of abode in the UK.  The other categories of British nationality would not hold such status based on nationality, although in some cases would do so under the immigration laws.

Whilst in opposition in 1977, the Conservative Party asked Edward Gardner to chair a study group to provide advice on changes to the nationality laws. The resultant Green paper, "Who Do We Think We Are?", was published in 1980 and its threefold definition of nationality formed the basis for the Government's legislation. Originally the paper proposed just two categories of British nationality, British citizenship and British Overseas citizenship. However, the British Dependent Territory governments successfully lobbied for an additional category of nationality, which would cater for those with close connections to any of the British territories.

Modification of jus soli
The Act also modified the application of jus soli in British nationality. Prior to the Act coming into force, any person born in the United Kingdom or a colony (with limited exceptions such as children of diplomats and enemy aliens) was entitled to CUKC status. After the Act came into force, it was necessary for at least one parent of a United Kingdom-born child to be a British citizen, a British Dependent Territories citizen or "settled" in the United Kingdom or a colony (a permanent resident).

Even following the coming into force of the Act, the vast majority of children born in the United Kingdom or colonies still acquire British nationality at birth.  Special provisions are made for non-British UK born children to acquire British citizenship in certain circumstances.

Relation to Immigration Act 1971

Under section 11(1) of the Act, a CUKC must have had the right of abode under the Immigration Act 1971, as it existed on 31 December 1982, to become a British citizen on 1 January 1983 automatically under the standard CUKC transition at commencement route of the Act.

Section 39 of the Act then went on to modify the right of abode section of the 1971 measure, eliminating confusing wording as to whether right of abode could be obtained through a grandparent who was a CUKC from outside the UK.

Other changes
The Act made a variety of other changes to the law:

 Mothers as well as fathers were allowed to pass on British nationality to their children.
 The term Commonwealth citizen was used to replace British subject.  Under the Act, the term British subject was restricted to certain persons holding British nationality through connections with British India or the Republic of Ireland before 1949.
 Right of Abode could no longer be acquired by non-British citizens.  A limited number of Commonwealth citizens holding Right of Abode were allowed to retain it.
 The rights of Commonwealth and Irish citizens to become British citizens by registration were removed and instead they were to be expected to apply for naturalisation if they wanted to acquire British citizenship. Irish citizens, however, who were, or claim British subject nationality retain their right to acquire British citizenship nationality through registration.
 Special provision was made for persons from Gibraltar to acquire British citizenship.
 Foreign spouses were treated equally under the law. Wives of British men could no longer acquire British nationality purely by marriage and husbands of British women were afforded the right to acquire British nationality on equal terms.
 British Crown Colonies were renamed British Dependent Territories (subsequently amended to British Overseas Territories)
 The Channel Islands and the Isle of Man, references to which had been construed as references to colonies under the British Nationality Act 1948, were now to be construed as being part of the United Kingdom for nationality purposes.

In some cases, transitional arrangements were made that preserved certain aspects of the old legislation. Most of these expired on 31 December 1987, five years after the Act came into force.

Criticisms
Critics argued that one of the main political motivations behind the new law was to deny most Hong Kong-born ethnic Chinese the right of residency in the United Kingdom in the time preceding the Sino-British Joint Declaration in 1984 and later the handover of Hong Kong (then the largest British colony by population), to the People's Republic of China in 1997. However, persons from Hong Kong had lost the automatic right to live in the United Kingdom in 1968, and the Act did not change this. 

The Commonwealth Immigrants Act 1968 made a number of changes to the Commonwealth Immigrants Act 1962, beginning with amending the definition of to whom the Act applied. By comparison:

Commonwealth Immigrants Act 1962:

Commonwealth Immigrants Act 1968:

The stripping of birth rights from Bermudians by the British Government in 1968 and 1971, and the change of their citizenship in 1983, actually violated the rights granted them by Royal Charters at the founding of the colony. Bermuda (fully The Somers Isles or Islands of Bermuda) had been settled by the London Company (which had been in occupation of the archipelago since the 1609 wreck of the Sea Venture) in 1612, when it received its Third Royal Charter from King James I, amending the boundaries of the First Colony of Virginia far enough across the Atlantic to include Bermuda. The citizenship rights guaranteed to settlers by King James I in the original Royal Charter of the 10 April 1606, thereby applied to Bermudians:

These rights were confirmed in the Royal Charter granted to the London Company's spin-off, the Company of the City of London for the Plantacion of The Somers Isles, in 1615 on Bermuda being separated from Virginia:

Bermuda is not the only territory whose citizenship rights were laid down in a Royal Charter. In regards to St. Helena, Lord Beaumont of Whitley in the House of Lords debate on the British Overseas Territories Bill on 10 July 2001, stated:

Other criticisms were levelled at the time at the removal of the automatic right to citizenship by birth in the United Kingdom. However, because UK-born children of permanent residents are automatically British, the number of non-British children born in the United Kingdom is relatively small. Special provisions made in the Act (for those who do not have another nationality and for those who lived a long time in the United Kingdom) means there is little pressure for any change to the current law. Similar legislation was later enacted in Australia (1986), the Republic of Ireland (2004) and New Zealand (2005).

After the Act
After the Falklands War, full British citizenship was granted to the Falkland Islanders by the British Nationality (Falkland Islands) Act 1983. Gibraltarians were also permitted to retain full British citizenship.

See also
 Denaturalization laws
 British nationality law
 History of British nationality law

References

External links
  (Note that this website does not always include the most recent amendments: see warning on website.)

United Kingdom Acts of Parliament 1981
Immigration law in the United Kingdom
British Overseas Territories and Crown Dependencies
British nationality law
1981 in Gibraltar
Acts of the Parliament of the United Kingdom concerning Hong Kong
Acts of the Parliament of the United Kingdom by subject